Marwan Mohammed (Arabic:مروان محمد) (born 8 January 1994) is an Emirati footballer. He currently plays for Al Dhaid as a left back, most recently for Hatta.

External links

References

Emirati footballers
1994 births
Living people
Al Shabab Al Arabi Club Dubai players
Emirates Club players
Hatta Club players
Al-Arabi SC (UAE) players
Al Dhaid SC players
UAE First Division League players
UAE Pro League players
Association football fullbacks